Tansterne is a hamlet in the East Riding of Yorkshire, England. It lies off the B1238 road.

It forms part of the civil parish of Aldbrough.

References

External links

Villages in the East Riding of Yorkshire
Holderness